The Dancom Group is a telecommunications company operating in Malaysia. It was established in 1985 as Dancom Telecommunications Sdn Bhd.

References

External links

Telecommunications companies of Malaysia
Telecommunications companies established in 1985
1985 establishments in Malaysia
Companies based in Kuala Lumpur
Privately held companies of Malaysia
Malaysian brands